Hypsela may refer to :

 Hypsela (plant) a plant genus now considered to be a synonym of Lobelia
 Hypselis, ancient city in Egypt